Molgula, or sea grapes, are very common, globular, individual marine tunicates roughly the size of grapes.

They are translucent with two protruding siphons. They are found subtidally, attached to slow-moving submerged objects or organisms. All species of Molgula have a fluid-filled structure called the renal sac. The renal sac contains nitrogenous wastes, solid concretions composed of weddellite and calcite, and an apicomplexan symbiont called Nephromyces.

In the western Atlantic Ocean, they range from the Arctic to North Carolina, to the center of the United States Eastern Seaboard.

Species

 Molgula aidae Oka, 1914
 Molgula amesophleba (Codreanu & Mack-Fira, 1956)
 Molgula antiborealis Millar, 1967
 Molgula appendiculata Heller, 1877
 Molgula arenata Stimpson, 1852
 Molgula bacca (Herdman, 1910)
 Molgula bathybia (Hartmeyer, 1912)
 Molgula bisinus Monniot, 1989
 Molgula bleizi (Lacaze-Duthiers, 1877)
 Molgula bourbonis Monniot, 1994
 Molgula braziliensis Millar, 1958
 Molgula brieni Monniot & Monniot, 1976
 Molgula calvata Sluiter, 1904
 Molgula caminae Monniot C. & Monniot F., 1988
 Molgula celata (Michaelsen, 1914)
 Molgula celebensis Millar, 1975
 Molgula celtica Monniot, C., 1970
 Molgula citrina Alder & Hancock, 1848
 Molgula coactilis Monniot & Monniot, 1977
 Molgula complanata Alder & Hancock, 1870
 Molgula conchata Sluiter, 1898
 Molgula confluxa (Sluiter, 1912)
 Molgula contorta Sluiter, 1898
 Molgula cooperi (Huntsman, 1912)
 Molgula crinita Sluiter, 1904
 Molgula crustosa Monniot C. & Monniot F., 1988
 Molgula cryptica Millar, 1962
 Molgula cynthiaeformis Hartmeyer, 1903
 Molgula davidi Monniot, 1972
 Molgula delicata Monniot & Monniot, 1991
 Molgula dextrocarpa Monniot C. & Monniot F., 1974
 Molgula diaguita Monniot & Andrade, 1983
 Molgula dicosta Millar, 1988
 Molgula dione (Savigny, 1816)
 Molgula discogona Millar, 1975
 Molgula diversa Kott, 1972
 Molgula dolichentera Millar, 1960
 Molgula ellistoni Kott, 1972
 Molgula elva Kott, 2008
 Molgula enodis (Sluiter, 1912)
 Molgula eobia Redikorzev, 1941
 Molgula estadosi Monniot & Monniot, 1983
 Molgula eugyroides Traustedt, 1883
 Molgula euplicata Herdman, 1923
 Molgula euprocta Drasche, 1884
 Molgula falsensis Millar, 1955
 Molgula ficus (Macdonald, 1859)
 Molgula flagrifera Sluiter, 1904
 Molgula fortuita Monniot & Monniot, 1984
 Molgula georgiana Michaelsen, 1922
 Molgula gigantea (Cunningham, 1871)
 Molgula griffithsii (MacLeay, 1825)
 Molgula habanensis Van Name, 1945
 Molgula hartmeyeri Oka, 1914
 Molgula helleri Drasche, 1884
 Molgula herdmani Brewin, 1958
 Molgula hirta Monniot F. 1965
 Molgula hodgsoni Herdman, 1910
 Molgula hozawai Oka, 1932
 Molgula impura Heller, 1877
 Molgula incidata Kott, 1985
 Molgula japonica Hartmeyer, 1906
 Molgula karubari Monniot & Monniot, 2003
 Molgula kerguelenensis Kott, 1954
 Molgula kiaeri Hartmeyer, 1901
 Molgula kolaensis Ärnbäck-Christie-Linde, 1928
 Molgula kophameli Michaelsen, 1900
 Molgula lapidifera Redikorzev, 1941
 Molgula longipedata Sluiter, 1904
 Molgula longitubis Monniot, 2002
 Molgula longivascula Millar, 1982
 Molgula lutulenta Herdman, 1923
 Molgula macquariensis Kott, 1954
 Molgula malvinensis Arnback, 1938
 Molgula manhattensis (De Kay, 1843)
 Molgula marioni Millar, 1960
 Molgula millari Kott, 1971
 Molgula mira (Ärnbäck, 1931)
 Molgula mollis Herdman, 1899
 Molgula monodi Peres, 1949
 Molgula mortenseni (Michaelsen, 1922)
 Molgula napiformis Lambert, 1993
 Molgula novaeselandiae (Michaelsen, 1912)
 Molgula occidentalis Traustedt, 1883
 Molgula occulta Kupffer, 1875
 Molgula oculata Forbes, 1848
 Molgula oligostriata Tokioka, 1949
 Molgula oregonia Ritter, 1913
 Molgula pacifica (Huntsman, 1912)
 Molgula pedunculata Herdman, 1881
 Molgula phytophila Monniot, 1970
 Molgula pigafettae Monniot & Monniot, 1983
 Molgula pila Monniot & Monniot, 1985
 Molgula plana Monniot, C., 1971
 Molgula platana Van Name, 1945
 Molgula platei Hartmeyer, 1914
 Molgula platybranchia (Monniot, 1970)
 Molgula primitiva Redikorzev, 1941
 Molgula provisionalis Van Name, 1945
 Molgula pugetiensis Herdman, 1898
 Molgula pulchra Michaelsen, 1900
 Molgula pumila Monniot F. & Monniot C., 1976
 Molgula pyriformis Herdman, 1881
 Molgula redikorzevi Oka, 1914
 Molgula regularis Ritter, 1907
 Molgula retortiformis Verrill, 1871
 Molgula rheophila (Pérès, 1956)
 Molgula riddlei F. Monniot, 2011
 Molgula ridgewayi (Herdman, 1906)
 Molgula rima Kott, 1972
 Molgula robini Monniot & Monniot, 1983
 Molgula robusta (Van Name, 1912)
 Molgula romeri Hartmeyer, 1903
 Molgula rotunda Oka, 1914
 Molgula roulei Monniot C., 1969
 Molgula sabulosa (Quoy & Gaimard, 1834)
 Molgula salvadori Monniot, 1970
 Molgula satyrus Monniot C. & Monniot F., 1993
 Molgula scutata Millar, 1955
 Molgula setigera Arnback, 1938
 Molgula shimodensis Nishikawa, 1982
 Molgula simplex Alder & Hancock, 1870
 Molgula siphonalis Kiaer, 1896
 Molgula siphonata Alder, 1850
 Molgula sluiteri (Michaelsen, 1922)
 Molgula socialis Alder, 1863
 Molgula solenata (Lacaze-Duthiers, 1877)
 Molgula somaliensis Millar, 1988
 Molgula sphaera Kott, 1972
 Molgula spiralis Kott, 1954
 Molgula susana Monniot & Monniot, 1976
 Molgula tagi Michaelsen, 1923
 Molgula taprobane Herdman, 1906
 Molgula tectiformis Nishikawa, 1991
 Molgula tethys Monniot F. & Monniot C., 1974
 Molgula topata Monniot & Monniot, 1987
 Molgula tubifera (Orstedt, 1844)
 Molgula tzetlini Sanamyan, 1993
 Molgula undulata (Tokioka, 1949)
 Molgula vara Monniot C. & Monniot F., 1979
 Molgula variazizi Monniot, 1978
 Molgula verrilli (Van Name, 1912)
 Molgula verrucifera Ritter & Forsyth, 1917
 Molgula xenophora Oka, 1914

References

Further reading 
 Howson, C. M.; Picton, B. E. (Ed.) (1997). The species directory of the marine fauna and flora of the British Isles and surrounding seas. Ulster Museum Publication, 276. The Ulster Museum: Belfast, UK. . vi, 508 (+ cd-rom) pp.
 Monniot, C. (2001). Ascidiacea & Sorberacea, in: Costello, M. J. et al. (Ed.) (2001). European register of marine species: a check-list of the marine species in Europe and a bibliography of guides to their identification. Collection Patrimoines Naturels, 50: pp. 352–355
 Sanamyan, K. (2007). Database of extant Ascidiacea. Version of 2 November 2007

Stolidobranchia
Tunicate genera